Mikko Helisten (born June 15, 1975) is a Finnish former ice hockey centre.

Helisten played one season in the SM-liiga for Tappara during the 1995–96 season. He played 34 games and registered one assist. He also played in the 1. Divisioona for Oulun Kärpät, Junkkarit HT, Ketterä and KOOVEE.

References

External links

1975 births
Living people
Finnish ice hockey centres
Imatran Ketterä players
KOOVEE players
Oulun Kärpät players
Sportspeople from Oulu
Tappara players